El Matareya is a district in the Eastern Area of Cairo,  Egypt. The district is unrelated to the coastal town in the Dakahlia Governorate, that is also named El Matareya. The district holds the ruins of the ancient Egyptian city of Heliopolis, one of the oldest cities of ancient Egypt.

Name 
The name, El Matareya, is thought to come from the Latin word Mater which means 'mother', and is from the presence of the 'tree of the Virgin Mary' in this district.

History 

El Matareya, with the nearby Ain Shams district, had a notable history during Egypt's Pharaonic period as a part of ancient Heliopolis. The district has archaeological sites of the period, some only recently discovered, beneath its current structures. In ancient Roman times Heliopolis belonged to the Augustamnica province. Legend tells of the Christian Holy Family sheltering under a tree in Heliopolis, presently known as 'the tree of the Virgin Mary', now with the Chapel of the Virgin in El Matareya.

The French naturalist Pierre Belon du Mans mentions visiting El Matareya in his 1547 journey to Egypt.  El Matareya once had the villas of prominent people. The famous Egyptian poet Ahmed Shawqi lived in a villa he named ‘Karmet Ibn Hani’ or Ibn Hani's Vineyard كرمة ابن هانىء  here, near the palace of the Khedive Abbas II at Saray El-Qobba, until his exile from Egypt at World War I.

Historic elements

The El Masalla area of the district contains the ancient Masalla Obelisk, or Misalla  (trans. obelisk), one of the Pharaonic era obelisks that still remain in Egypt. It is the only surviving element of Heliopolis standing in its original position, and of the great Temple of Ra—Atum constructed by Pharaoh Senusret I (1971—1926 BCE) of the Twelfth Dynasty.

A pink granite megalithic colossus statue, with features resembling those of the Pharaoh Ramesses II, was found in El Matareya in 2006, weighing five tons—. It was at the ruins of a sun temple dating back to the reign of Ramses II (reigned 1279—1213 BCE), at the site of later Souk El-Khamis.

The underground tombs of High Priests of Re of the Sixth Dynasty (2345—2181 BCE) were found in the southeast corner of the Re-Atum Temple archaeological site in El Matareya. A domed tomb made for a priest during the Twenty-sixth Dynasty (c. 685—525 BCE), was discovered under a construction site in 2004. Many funereal small figure statues were found inside (over 400), and hieroglyphic writing was on the tomb's walls from the seventh century BCE.

In March 2017, the Egyptian-German team of archaeologists unearthed an eight-meter 3,000-year-old statue that included a head and a torso thought to depict Pharaoh Ramses II. According to Khaled El-Enany, the Egyptian Antiquities Minister, the statue was more likely thought to be King Psammetich I. Excavators also revealed an 80 cm-long part of a limestone statue of Pharaoh Seti II while excavating the site.

Pilgrimage site 

A sycamore tree within the suburb, known locally as the Tree of the Virgin, has been a place of pilgrimage for Coptic Christians for many centuries, who come to pray by it or touch it, believing that it will heal illness.  According to local beliefs, the Virgin Mary and Saint Joseph stopped at El Matareya (then a small village) when they fled into Egypt. Mary rested against the tree and a spring of water sprang up near it for Mary to wash the infant Jesus. For many years its bark was taken by Christians in the belief that it had miraculous properties. Next to the tree is a small chapel.

Administrative subdivisions 
Matariya is subdivided into nine shiakhas.

In the 2017  census Matariya had 602,485 residents across its nine shiakhas.

Education
 Desert Research Center, established by Laszlo Almasy
 Faculty of Engineering, Helwan University
 National Urology Institute of Egypt
 El Matareya Teaching Hospital

Industry
The western part of El Matareya, within the industrial area of Musturud along the Ismailia canal, is the location of oil companies (Shell, Misr Petrol, and General Association of Oil in Egypt), and food industries (BiscoMisr and Misr lil Albaan).

See also
Ancient Heliopolis
Modern Heliopolis
Heliopolis style - architecture
El Matareya - a town in Dakahlia governorate.

References 

History of Cairo
Districts of Greater Cairo
Archaeological sites in Egypt

ar:مطرية (القاهرة)